Monster Rancher, known in Japan as , is a Japanese anime television series based on Tecmo's Monster Rancher video game franchise. It originally aired on TBS in Japan for two seasons from April 1999 to September 2000. In North America, the series was first licensed by BKN, Inc. and broadcast with an English dub on the Bohbot Kids Network, the Sci-Fi Channel, the Fox Family Channel, and Fox Kids in the United States and YTV in Canada. It was later licensed by Discotek Media in 2013.

Story

The story follows a boy named Genki Sakura, who is a key player of the Monster Rancher video games. After winning a tournament hosted by the game's creators, Genki wins a special CD that he can use to unlock a special monster in his game at home. However, upon using this disk in his game console, he finds himself transported to a world of monsters that, much like Genki's game, are given life by scanning special stone disks within temples. There, he meets a girl named Holly and her monster friend Suezo, who are seeking a stone disk containing a legendary Phoenix that will save the land from the tyranny of an evil ruler named Moo. Upon attempting to use the disk Genki had won to try and release the monster, they bring forth a different monster, which Genki names Mocchi. Wanting to free the land from Moo's rule, Genki, Holly, Mocchi, and Suezo set off to find the Phoenix, using Holly's Magic Stone to guide them in the direction of the Phoenix. The Magic Stone leads them to Golem, Tiger, and Hare, each of which have their motivations to join the group on their journey to find the Phoenix. 

It is revealed that Moo is actually Holly's missing father, who merged with an evil spirit after being banished from his village. Determined to separate Moo's evil spirit from Holly's father, the group continues their search for the Phoenix, defeating Moo's strongest minions, the Big Bad Four- Pixie, Gali, Grey Wolf, and Naga. In their travels, the gang befriends and aids many monsters as they continue searching, unlocking as many Mystery Disks as possible in the hopes of finding the Phoenix. One of these unlocked monsters, Monol, tells the group of a previous war between Moo and the Phoenix (as part of a larger war between humans and monsters, who exploited monsters as workers and companions in a futuristic society) that destroyed much of the world and weakened the two entities into their dormant states, separating their body and souls.

In the end of the first season, Moo's body is found and merges with Holly's father. Shortly after, the Phoenix's body is found, and it is revealed that the five monsters – Mocchi, Suezo, Golem, Tiger, and Hare – are pieces of the Phoenix's soul. Understanding what must be done, they say goodbye to Genki and merge with the Phoenix's body, and begin to fight Moo. As the two beings fight, Moo realizes that good and evil are inherently inseparable, and that the two are doomed to repeat a perpetually repeating fight as representatives of the two forces. The two monsters seemingly die, and Genki is knocked back into the real world in the resulting explosion, comforted by visions of his friends as he goes home. 

The second season consists of Genki returning to the Monster World to revive and reunite his friends, who were turned into disks and separated after the fight with Moo. The gang must compete in a series of tournaments against General Durahan's army in their pursuit to find Holly's father. The third season ends with Genki and the others battling the soul of Moo that has possessed Durahan; during the credits of the final episode it is revealed in the Japanese version that both Genki and Mocchi are able to travel between both the Monster Rancher world and Earth.

Broadcast and release
In Japan, under the title Monster Farm, the series was broadcast on TBS for two seasons; the first 48-episode season, aired from April 17, 1999, to March 25, 2000; the second 25-episode season, aired from April 1 to September 30, 2000.

The series was brought to the United States by BKN, with an English dub produced by Ocean Studios. It was also broadcast in the United States on the Sci-Fi Channel and Fox Kids and in Canada on YTV. In the United Kingdom, the series aired on children's Saturday morning show Live & Kicking, with episodes also airing on CBBC (on BBC Two) until April 9, 2001. Repeats of the series continued throughout the year and early February 25, 2002.

ADV Films licensed the home video rights to the series and released its first twelve episodes on four DVDs. In 2005, BKN International A.G. licensed the DVD rights for 73 episodes of Monster Rancher to Digiview Productions; however, only one DVD was released. In 2012, the series was available for streaming on Hulu. Discotek Media licensed the series in 2013, and released it on three English-dubbed DVD box sets in 2014, and a single box set with the original Japanese audio subtitled and uncut on July 28, 2015. Discotek Media later released the series on a Blu-ray Disc set on May 29, 2018.

References

External links
 
 

Monster Rancher
1999 anime television series debuts
ADV Films
Anime television series based on video games
Discotek Media
TMS Entertainment
TBS Television (Japan) original programming
Works based on Tecmo Koei video games

de:Monster Rancher